Hookeriales is the botanical name of an order of Bryophyta or leafy mosses. Named for William Jackson Hooker, it is composed of mainly subtropical and tropical species of mosses with generally complanate and asymmetrical leaves.

Families 
Hookeriales comprises the following families:
 Daltoniaceae
 Hookeriaceae
 Hypopterygiaceae
 Leucomiaceae
 Pilotrichaceae
 Saulomataceae
 Schimperobryaceae

References

External links 

 
Moss orders
Taxa named by James Edward Smith